Mared (also Romanized as Māred, Mārad, Mārd, and Mārid) is a village in Howmeh-ye Sharqi Rural District, in the Central District of Khorramshahr County, Khuzestan Province, Iran. At the 2006 census, its population was 32, in 9 families. Iraqi army personnel crossed the Karun river at Mared on October 9, 1980 as part of an attempted flanking operation during the Iran–Iraq War.

References 

Populated places in Khorramshahr County